Lollipop is the Meat Puppets' thirteenth full-length studio album. It was released on April 12, 2011, through Megaforce Records.

Content

Musical style 
The A.V. Club opined Lollipop to be "a strong collection of power-pop songs".

Lyrical content 
In an AllMusic summary of Lollipop, the lyrics were described as "goofball surrealism" and "alternating tall tales with weed-fueled philosophizing".

Name 
Curt Kirkwood remarked in a 2011 interview with AV Club that the decision to name the record Lollipop was brought about by its power-pop sound, further commenting "this counts as, you know, “pop-candy” for us".

Reception 

Based on 12 reviews, Metacritic assigned Lollipop a score of 71, indicating "generally favorable reviews".

In 3.5 out-of 5 star review, Mark Deming of AllMusic described Lollipop as "flawed but interesting enough to confirm there's still life left in this band" which would hopefully "document in a more satisfying manner" on the next album.

Slant Magazine gave a mixed 2 and a half-out-of-5 star review of Lollipop, summarizing that the record "sounds a little tired".

Track listing
All songs by Curt Kirkwood.

 "Incomplete" - 4:09
 "Orange" - 4:11
 "Shave It" - 4:18
 "Baby Don't" - 3:11
 "Hour of the Idiot" - 3:35
 "Lantern" - 3:34
 "Town" - 3:20
 "Damn Thing" - 3:44
 "Amazing" - 4:49
 "Way That It Are" - 3:28
 "Vile" - 4:42
 "The Spider and the Spaceship" - 3:29

Personnel
Curt Kirkwood - vocals, guitars
Cris Kirkwood - vocals, bass guitar
Shandon Sahm - drums

References

Meat Puppets albums
2011 albums
Megaforce Records albums